The Casino de Paris, located at 16, rue de Clichy, in the 9th arrondissement, is one of the well known music halls of Paris, with a history dating back to the 18th century. Contrary to what the name might suggest, it is a performance venue, not a gambling house. The closest métro/RER stations are Liège, Trinité – d'Estienne d'Orves, and Haussmann – Saint-Lazare.

The first building at this location where shows could be mounted was erected by the Duc de Richelieu around 1730, while after the Revolution the site was renamed Jardin de Tivoli and was the venue for fireworks displays. In 1880 it became the Palace Theatre, which housed shows of different types, including wrestling.

It was at the beginning of the First World War, however, that the modern Casino de Paris began to take shape, when the venue was converted into a cinema and music hall. After the bombardments of the First World War caused performances to be interrupted, the revue format was resumed, one which lasted through a good part of the twentieth century.

Over the decades, performers who have played the Casino de Paris have included Mistinguett, Maurice Chevalier, Josephine Baker, Micheline Bernardini, Tino Rossi, Line Renaud, Shakin' Stevens, Carla Bruni, Violetta Villas, Georges Guétary, and Zizi Jeanmaire; writers who have contributed work have included Serge Gainsbourg and Jean Ferrat; Yves Saint Laurent designed for the Casino in the 1970s, and poster artists have included Erté and Jules Chéret.

See also
 Olympia (Paris)
 Jubilee!
 Peepshow
 Sirens of TI
 Absinthe
 Moulin Rouge
 Le Lido
 Folies Bergère
 Paradis Latin
 Cabaret Red Light
 Tropicana Club

References
Official Site
"Plus qu'une salle de spectacles, un des hauts lieux dans l'histoire des revues hautes en couleurs de la capital" from Le Figaro
"At the Big Casino de Paris" from The New York Times, November 2, 1890

Music halls in Paris
Buildings and structures in the 9th arrondissement of Paris
Music venues in France
Édouard Niermans buildings